Georg Siegmund Facius (appx. 1750 Regensburg - in or before 1813) was cartographer and painter. Brother of engraver Johann Gottlieb Facius.

The Facius brothers were born in Regensburg (Germany) and received engraving training in Brussels. By 1776, their works were already well known and they moved to London at the invitation of John Boydell, with whom they worked for many years.

References 

British cartographers
1750 births
1813 deaths
British painters